Ravage may refer to:
Ravage 2099, a fictional superhero, set in the far future, from Marvel Comics
Ravage (Marvel Comics), a fictional villain in Marvel Comics and one of the Hulk's enemies
Ravager (comics), name of five fictional comic book characters in the DC Universe
The Ravagers (comics), a group of superpowered teens in DC Comics
Ravage (novel), a 1943 novel by René Barjavel

See also 
Ravager (disambiguation)